Qaleh Zanjir-e Sofla (also Romanized as Qal‘eh Zanjīr-e Soflá; also known as Qal‘eh Zanjīr) is a village in Qalkhani Rural District, Gahvareh District, Dalahu County, Kermanshah Province, Iran. At the 2006 census, its population was 177, in 38 families.

References 

Populated places in Dalahu County